, lit. "Madame Company President", is a 1953 Japanese black-and-white musical film directed by Yuzo Kawashima.

Cast 
 Hibari Misora as Madoka Ohara
 Ichirō Arishima as Tetsutaro Kaitani
 Takiko Egawa as musical actress
 Kodayu Ichikawa as Juzaburo Ohara
 Kokinji Katsura as Sanpachi Sakurakawa
 Shoichi Kofujita as Mr. O
 Yōko Kosono as Kikuko Morikawa
 Tatsuo Nagai as Mito
 Shinyo Nara as a tutor Sugiura
 Shirō Osaka as Keigo Namiki
 Keiji Sada as Goro Akiyama
 Takeshi Sakamoto as Ippachi Sakurakawa
 Mutsuko Sakura as Osugi Morikawa
 Ichirō Shimizu as Senzo Akakura
 Akira Takaya as Gamaroku
 Norikazu Takeda as Matsuzo Morikawa
 Jun Tatara as Yasuda
 Yumeji Tsukioka as Yumiko Kaitani

References

External links 
 https://www.imdb.com/title/tt0408052/

Japanese black-and-white films
1953 films
Films directed by Yuzo Kawashima
1953 musical films
Shochiku films
Japanese musical films
1950s Japanese films